The Balzekas Museum of Lithuanian Culture is located at 6500 S. Pulaski Rd. in Chicago's West Lawn neighborhood, not far from Chicago Midway International Airport. Founded in 1966, the Balzekas Museum is dedicated to the preservation and perpetuation of Lithuanian culture and is the largest museum in the United States devoted to the subjects of Lithuania, the Lithuanian language, history, culture and politics, and to the Lithuanian-American experience. The museum hosts events, programs, and workshops, such as traditional Lithuanian Užgavėnės (Mardi-Gras) mask making, vėlykaičiai or margučiai Easter egg decorating, and straw Christmas ornament making.  The museum is a popular destination for tourists and schools, seeking to learn about Lithuanian history, culture, and immigration.  Promoting the study and appreciation of America's diverse ethnic cultural heritage and seeking to foster greater understanding among all people, the museum works cooperatively with numerous ethnic groups; cultural, arts and educational organizations; museums; fraternal orders; religious entities; and governmental institutions. The Balzekas Museum is a non-profit 501(c)(3) organization. It was founded by Lithuanian-American businessman Stanley Balzekas, Jr., who passed away in 2020. Chicago's Lithuanian community has more Lithuanians and people of Lithuanian descent than anywhere in the world outside of Lithuania itself.

The museum's bulletin, called the Lithuanian Museum Review, is published quarterly.

References

External links
 The official web site of the Balzekas Museum of Lithuanian Culture

Lithuanian-American culture in Chicago
Museums in Chicago
Museums of Lithuanian culture abroad
Ethnic museums in Illinois
Folk art museums and galleries in Illinois
Museums established in 1966
1966 establishments in Illinois
European-American museums
Cultural centers in Chicago